The 1996 Sunkist Orange Bottlers season was the seventh season of the franchise in the Philippine Basketball Association (PBA).

Occurrences
Tony Harris came back as their import in the Governor's Cup, but the Hurricane could only play three games after Sunkist lost two straight matches to Shell and Purefoods. The coaching staff decided to replace Harris with a new import Lester Neal.

Notable dates
March 12: Vergel Meneses unloaded 14 of his 29 points in the fourth quarter and led a breakaway by Sunkist in the last eight minutes as the defending All-Filipino Cup champions pulled off a 93-84 victory over San Miguel Beermen and evened up their won-loss record to three wins and three losses. 

June 21: Marques Bragg banged in a three-point play off Ronnie Thompkins with 14.5 seconds left to snap the final tie and Sunkist recovered from an early 16-point deficit to scuttle Purefoods Tender Juicy Hotdogs, 97-93. It was the Orange Bottlers first win in three games in the Commissioners Cup. 

September 29: Alvin Teng put back a miss by Tony Harris with 4.7 seconds left to lift Sunkist to a thrilling 93-91 victory over defending champion Alaska Milkmen at the start of the Governors Cup.

Roster

Transactions

Additions

Trades

Recruited imports

References

Pop Cola Panthers seasons
Sunkist